Sidney Kemble (23 January 1914 – 10 April 1979) was a British weightlifter. He competed in the men's featherweight event at the 1948 Summer Olympics.

References

1914 births
1979 deaths
British male weightlifters
Olympic weightlifters of Great Britain
Weightlifters at the 1948 Summer Olympics
Sportspeople from Bradford